Bayi-Brikolo is a department of Haut-Ogooué Province in Gabon. It had a population of 1,998 in 2013.

References 
  

Departments of Gabon